Moehringia lateriflora, commonly known as the bluntleaf sandwort, is a plant species native to Europe, Asia, the northern United States and most of Canada. It has been reported from every province and territory in Canada except the Northwest Territories, as well as every state in the northern half of the US, including Alaska, plus New Mexico and from Saint Pierre & Miquelon. It is also reported from Russia, China, Korea, Mongolia, Japan, Kazakhstan, Finland, Sweden, Norway, Latvia, Estonia, Belarus, Ukraine.

Moehringia lateriflora is a perennial herb spreading by means of underground rhizomes, often forming large colonies. Aerial stems are up to 30 cm long, covered with retrorse (pointing down toward the base of the stem) hairs. Leaves are broad, up to 35 mm long. Flowers occur singly or in groups of 2–5. Petals are white, up to 6 mm long, generally twice as long as the sepals.

References

lateriflora
Flora of the United States
Flora of Canada
Flora of Russia
Flora of Saint Pierre and Miquelon
Flora of China
Flora of Korea
Flora of Japan
Flora of Kazakhstan
Flora of Mongolia
Flora of Europe
Taxa named by Carl Linnaeus